Jemielno  is a village in the administrative district of Gmina Przechlewo, within Człuchów County, Pomeranian Voivodeship, in northern Poland.

For details of the history of the region, see History of Pomerania.

Notable residents
 Karl-Eric Bertram (1903–1945), Luftwaffe officer

References

Villages in Człuchów County